Zawadzkie  (1936–1945 Andreashütte) is a town in Strzelce County, Opole Voivodeship, Poland, with 7,135 inhabitants (2019). In this area are located two villages: Kielcza, Żędowice.

Twin towns – sister cities
See twin towns of Gmina Zawadzkie.

References

External links
 History of Zawadzkie website

Cities and towns in Opole Voivodeship
Strzelce County
Cities in Silesia